Robert Hales may refer to:

Robert Hales (c. 1325–1381), Lord High Treasurer of England
Robert Hales (director), British graphic designer and music video director
Robert D. Hales (1932–2017), American leader in The Church of Jesus Christ of Latter-day Saints

See also
Robert Hale (disambiguation)